The Eddy Arboretum is located at the Institute of Forest Genetics in the Sierra Nevada near Placerville, in El Dorado County, eastern California.

Collection
The arboretum contains what is claimed to be the best-documented collection of native and exotic pines in the world, in addition to many other native and exotic conifers.

78 pine species, 24 fir species, and many other conifer species are growing on the arboretum's grounds. Some species collections sample a wide range of genetic diversity, such as the native California conifers  Pinus lambertiana and Pinus coulteri.

The Arboretum's first plantings were made in 1926. Because genetic diversity is the raw material for breeding, the Arboretum assembled as many pine species and varieties as possible. The origins of individual seeds were recorded, often mapping the location of each parent tree.

Access
The Eddy Arboretum is part of the Pacific Southwest Research Station of the United States Forest Service. It is open to the public during business hours, excluding weekends and holidays.

See also 
 
 
 List of botanical gardens in the United States
 List of California native plants

External links 
 Pacific Southwest Research Station: official Eddy Arboretum website
 USDA Forest Service: Pacific Southwest Research Station homepage

Arboreta in California
Protected areas of El Dorado County, California
Protected areas of the Sierra Nevada (United States)
Natural history of El Dorado County, California
Trees of the Southwestern United States
1926 establishments in California